Richard Avonde (1914–1981) was a Canadian film actor who settled in the United States. He appeared in more than 50 films and television series.

In 1956, Avonde completed his 200th role in a television series when he appeared in an episode of Tales of the 77th Bengal Lancers on NBC.

Filmography

Selected Television

References

Bibliography
 Blottner, Gene. Columbia Noir: A Complete Filmography, 1940-1962. McFarland, 2015.

External links

1914 births
1981 deaths
Canadian male film actors
Canadian male television actors
Male actors from Hamilton, Ontario
Canadian emigrants to the United States